Lissac may refer to:

Lissac, Ariège, in the Ariège department
Lissac, Haute-Loire, in the Haute-Loire department
Lissac-et-Mouret, in the Lot department
Lissac-sur-Couze, in the Corrèze department
Lissac, a French eyewear company, renamed Silor, a predecessor to Essilor